Louis Cottrell (December 25, 1878 – October 17, 1927) was an influential American jazz drummer. "Old Man" Cottrell was the father of Louis Cottrell Jr. and great-grandfather of New Orleans jazz drummer Louis Cottrell.

Cottrell was born and died in New Orleans. He played with John Robichaux's orchestra in 1909 and with the Olympia Orchestra in New Orleans from 1900 to 1915. From 1916 to 1918 he played in Chicago with Manuel Perez, then played with A.J. Piron until the time of his death.

"Old Man" Cottrell has been credited as the innovator of the press roll in jazz drumming, and was a significant influence on most New Orleans drummers of the time, having taught Alex Bigard, Baby Dodds, Paul Barbarin, Louis Barbarin, Freddie Kohlman, Cie Frazier and Alfred Williams.

References
Mike Hazeldine, "Louis Cottrell, Sr." Grove Jazz online.
Leonard Feather and Ira Gitler, The Biographical Encyclopedia of Jazz. Oxford, 1999, p. 153.

1878 births
1927 deaths
American jazz drummers
Jazz musicians from New Orleans
20th-century American drummers
American male drummers
20th-century American male musicians
American male jazz musicians
Excelsior Brass Band members
Olympia Orchestra members